Innisfree (Hangul: 이니스프리) is a South Korean cosmetics brand owned and founded by Amore Pacific in 2000. The brand name derives from Irish poet W. B. Yeats' poem, 'The Lake Isle of Innisfree'. Innisfree has stores in South Korea, Hong Kong, China, Japan, Taiwan, Singapore, Malaysia, Thailand, Vietnam, Indonesia, the Philippines, India, the United States, Canada, Australia, and the United Arab Emirates.

Innisfree is popular for its affordability and brand concept, which emphasizes healthy and reasonably priced beauty products with ingredients responsibly sourced from Jeju Island, South Korea. Innisfree was the first K-beauty brand to launch two inclusive cushion foundation lines with 14 shades.

History

Innisfree was launched by the largest skincare and cosmetics company in South Korea, Amore Pacific, in 2002 and was marketed as the manufacturer's first eco-friendly brand. The brand name originates from W. B. Yeats' poem, 'The Lake Isle of Innisfree'.

Expansion
Amore Pacific opened its first brand road-shop in 2005 and its 100th in 2007.

Asia
The brand's first flagship store opened in Shanghai on April 25, 2012. The company expanded and in 2013, opened stores in Hong Kong, Singapore and India. The first Indian store was opened in New Delhi on October 10, 2013  and the first Singaporean store on November 22, 2013. By 2014, the company had over 80 stores in South Korea, Japan, Hong Kong, Singapore and India. In the first half of 2014, Amore Pacific planned on boosting the brand's sales in Taipei and opened a second store months after launching in Taiwan, aiming to make Innisfree the country's biggest South Korean skincare and cosmetics brand. On December 5, 2014, Innisfree opened its first store in Malaysia. In its fifteenth year, the brand was launched in Thailand and Innisfree opened its largest flagship store at Hongyi Square in Shanghai, China, with over 108 stores in the country by the end of the year. The first store in Vietnam was opened in November 2016, while the first store in the Philippines opened two years later.

North America
In 2017, the brand began expanding in the West and launched its first store in the United States on September 15, 2017, in Manhattan. Innisfree expanded its number of stores in the United States with the opening of another location in Manhattan on October 5, 2018. In May 2021, Amore Pacific announced that all North American Innisfree stores will close due to the negative impact the COVID-19 pandemic had on the market. However, Innisfree products will continue to be available via Sephora.

Sales
In 2011, the brand reported 140.5 billion won ($123.1 million) in sales from its 434 locations in South Korea.

In 2019, Innisfree's sales revenue was 552 billion won (~$490.6 million), down from 600 billion (~$533.3 million) in 2018. 

In 2020, Innisfree's reported its lowest net profit since 2013: approximately 10.22 billion won (~$9.06 million), down from about 48.87 billion won (~$43.3 million) in 2019.

Concept
Innisfree uses the slogan "Clean Island, where clean nature and healthy beauty coexist happily". The brand concept emphasises nature and eco-friendly practices.

Products

Innisfree is South Korea's first all-natural brand, and many of the products' ingredients are sourced from Jeju Island. The company's products range from makeup to skin care products for women and for men. Innisfree's products include the Super Volcanic Pore Clay Mask, Olive Real Cleansing Foam, and the Wine Peeling Jelly Softener. 

Innisfree's best-selling product worldwide is the Green Tea Seed Serum. 

In September 2020, Innisfree launched an anti-aging line, Black Tea Youth Enhancing, and expanded the line to the Singaporean market in January 2012.

Spokespersons and models
Innisfree has been endorsed by numerous celebrities since its launch in 2010. The brand's first model was Han Chae-young. Actresses Kim Tae-hee and Nam Sang-mi have also endorsed the brand.

Since 2006, its notable spokespersons include actress Song Hye-kyo, actress Moon Geun-young, Girls' Generation member Yoona, actor Lee Min-ho, Twice, Loona, Wanna One and Ahn Hyo-seop .

In 2021, singer-songwriter Stella Jang became an Innisfree cosmetics model. Recently, Innisfree unveiled its brand model Shin Ye-eun through a promotional video of its own brand's large-scale sale event, "Inni-Super-Big-Sale," which takes place once a year. IVE (former Iz*One) member Jang Won-young is the brand's global ambassador.

In February 2023, Innisfree welcomed Mingyu  of Seventeen for their next global ambassador.

Social Responsibility Activities 

 The empty bottle collection campaign: The empty bottle collection campaign is Innisfree's flagship Green Life campaign, which began in 2003. Customers can receive 300 Beauty Points for each empty bottle by returning the container of Innisfree products to the store. The number of empty bottles collected by 2020 is about 30,000, and in 2017, Innisfree opened an empty bottle space in an upcycling store that uses interior finishing materials using collected empty bottles.
 Upcycling Beauty: 'Upcycling Beauty' is a project that gives new value to discarded resources and recreates products with sincerity. In August 2018, we developed a body product using coffee foil, which was thrown away as the first project product, in collaboration with Anthracite, and in 2019, we developed a hairline with Jeju Beer. Recently, it secured Jeju Gujwa carrots, which cannot be sold from I'M Jeju, and launched an ugly carrot hand line made from carrot water and carrot oil extracted from carrots.

Paper Bottle Controversy
In 2020, Innisfree released a repackaged version of the Green Tea Seed Serum that said, "HELLO, I'M PAPER BOTTLE". In April 2021, a customer of the product accused Innisfree of "greenwashing" and posted photographs and comments on Facebook revealing that the product was in a plastic bottle. The post went viral and led to consumer backlash that circulated in local media. Innisfree issued a public apology acknowledging that the labeling may be misleading and clarified that the packaging is recyclable and that "paper bottle explain[s] the role of the paper label surrounding the bottle."

See also
 Shopping in Seoul
 List of South Korean retail companies
Cosmetics in Korea

References

External links

 
 
 

 Nám da mặt là gì? Cách phân biệt nám
 

Amorepacific brands
Personal care brands
Products introduced in 2000